Kanowna is a ghost town in the Goldfields region of Western Australia,  about  east of Kalgoorlie. It is sited on Maduwongga tribal lands. At the 2016 census, Kanowna had a population of 10 people.

After the discovery of gold in the area in 1893, the townsite was gazetted in 1894. and the population grew from 2,500 in 1897 to over 12,500 by 1899.
However, the alluvial gold supply was rapidly exhausted and underground mines following the outcropping vein produced decreasing amounts of gold, resulting in a slow but steady decrease in the population. The railway station was closed during the Great Depression, and by 1953 the town had been abandoned. The railway station platform, two cemeteries and mine workings are all that is left of the original town of Kanowna. Signs erected by the Eastern Goldfields Historical Society mark the sites of significant buildings.

Increasing gold prices in the late 1970s sparked renewed interest in exploring the geology of the area for new sources of gold. The discovery of a large amount of gold, previously undiscovered because the vein did not reach the surface, made gold mining in the region economically viable again. Mining recommenced in 1986, initially as open-cut mining, before moving to underground mines. As of 2002, the Kanowna Belle mine employed more than 300 people.

It formerly had its own local government: the Municipality of Kanowna (1896-1917) represented the township proper and the North East Coolgardie Road District (1896-1922) represented the surrounding area. The municipality merged into the road district in 1917, at which time the road district was renamed Kanowna.

See also
 Electoral district of Kanowna

References

Further reading
 Laurie, Kris (Kristien Elizabeth) (1993) Kanowna heritage trail : commemorating Kanowna's centenary, 1893–1993. Kalgoorlie, W.A : Kalgoorlie-Boulder Tourist Centre for Delta Gold N.L.
 Baugh, Robert (2016), Wealth for the Willing: The Story of Kanowna. 4/67 McCallum Lane, Victoria Park, Western Australia. ISBN 978-0-646-96359-4

Ghost towns in Western Australia